"Time In" is a song written by Rich Alves, Roger Murrah and James Dean Hicks, and recorded by American country music group The Oak Ridge Boys.  It was released in October 1987 as the first single from the album Heartbeat.  The song reached #17 on the Billboard Hot Country Singles & Tracks chart.

Chart performance

References

1987 singles
The Oak Ridge Boys songs
Songs written by Roger Murrah
Song recordings produced by Jimmy Bowen
MCA Records singles
Songs written by James Dean Hicks
1987 songs
Songs written by Rich Alves